Mitar Ašćerić (born 8 November 1973) is a Serbian professional basketball coach and former player who is the head coach for Dunav of the Basketball League of Serbia.

Playing career 
Ašćerić retired as a player with Dunav in 2006.

Coaching career 
In 2017, Ašćerić was hired as the head coach for Dunav. He previously worked there as an assistant coach. He left head coach stint in September 2021.

Personal life 
Ašćerić used to be a member of the Stara Pazova City Assembly.

References

External links
 Coach Profile at eurobasket.com

1973 births
Living people
OKK Dunav coaches
OKK Dunav players
Serbian basketball executives and administrators
Serbian men's basketball coaches
Serbian men's basketball players
People from Zemun